Lohr am Main (officially: Lohr a. Main) is a town in the Main-Spessart district in the Regierungsbezirk of Lower Franconia (Unterfranken) in Bavaria, Germany and the seat (but not a member) of the Verwaltungsgemeinschaft (municipal association) of Lohr am Main. It has a population of around 15,000.

Etymology
The town takes its name from the eponymous river that flows into the Main in the municipality.
 The addition "am Main" distinguishes it from other towns also named Lohr.

Past ways of spelling the name include:

Geography

Location 
The municipal territory extends on both banks of the Main about halfway between Würzburg and Aschaffenburg in Lower Franconia. The town of Lohr lies on the eastern slope of the Spessart at a bend in the river Main, which swings towards the south here, forming the beginning of the Mainviereck ("Main Square" – the southern part of the Spessart). In Lohr, the river Lohr empties into the Main. Perhaps for its geographical location or the fact that two major valleys lead into the interior of the range, the town is known as the "Gateway to the Spessart" (Tor zum Spessart).

The Main river valley is steep with an elevation change from 160 m above sea level at Gemünden dropping to 100 m above sea level at Hanau. The river Main in its natural state is a fast-moving stream unsuitable for shipping. In the 19th century the river was tamed and a system of dams and locks is now part of the Rhine-Main-Danube Canal connecting the North Sea with the Black Sea.

Geology 
The bedrock, with a depth of about 400 m, is made up mainly of sedimentary minerals. In the Spessart is found a great deal of bunter. This geological plain with a slight slope to the southeast is the product of a large continental sea that drained owing to a tectonic shift. In the east the range is abutted by the Fränkische Platte (a flat, mostly agricultural region), whose geology is mainly Muschelkalk-based.

The sandstone bedrock with strata of loess and clay in conjunction with an extensive forest provide for excellent water quality of the springs and ground water of the region. The people of Lohr thus enjoy high-quality drinking water. Currently large amounts of this water are pumped to areas as far away as Würzburg.

Subdivisions

The town has the following Gemarkungen (traditional rural cadastral areas): Halsbach, Lohr a. Main, Pflochsbach, Rodenbach, Ruppertshütten, Sackenbach, Sendelbach, Steinbach, Wombach.

Moreover, the town of Lohr am Main also owns plots of land within other municipalities, namely Partenstein, Gemünden am Main and Rechtenbach.

Neighbouring communities 
Clockwise from the north, these are Partenstein, Frammersbach, Flörsbachtal, Fellen, Burgsinn, Rieneck, Neuendorf, Gemünden am Main, Karlstadt, Steinfeld, Neustadt am Main and Rechtenbach.

History 

The town of Lohr am Main was settled no later than the 8th century, and by the time of its first documentary mention in 1295 it was already the main centre of the County of Rieneck. 

In 1333 Lohr was granted town rights, which can be explained by the disagreement about the inheritance of the Counts of Rieneck-Rothenfels, which had died out. Indeed, Lohr had been a "town" for quite some time already. The town lords were the Counts of Rieneck, who had been enfeoffed by the Archbishop of Mainz (evidence of this is only available beginning in 1366). 

In 1559, after the last Count of Rieneck, Philipp III’s death, the fief passed to the Archbishopric of Mainz. From 1603 to 1618, during the "Recatholization" many townsfolk fell victim to persecution as witches. The former Oberamt of the Prince-Bishopric of Würzburg was secularized in favour of Prince Primate von Dalberg's Principality of Aschaffenburg and passed along with this state in 1814 (by this time it had become a part of the Grand Duchy of Frankfurt) to the Kingdom of Bavaria. In the course of administrative reform in Bavaria, the current town-level municipality came into being with the Gemeindeedikt ("Municipal Edict") of 1818. 

In 1875, the Alte Mainbrücke (old Main bridge) was built. In 1936 came the new Lindig neighbourhood. In 1939, Sendelbach was amalgamated with the town.

Between 1940 and 1945, under Nazi rule more than 600 children, women and men were deported to Sonnenstein and Grafeneck, as well as to the Auschwitz and Mauthausen concentration camps from what was then the Health and Care Institute (now the Regional Hospital for Psychiatry) as part of the Euthanasia programme, "Action T4". Since 1993, a bronze relief in the street by artist Rainer Stoltz serves as a memorial to these victims of the Nazi régime.

On 2 April 1945, Lohr citizen Karl Brand was murdered, because he wanted to surrender the town to American troops without a fight. Since 1979, a memorial stone has recalled this.

From 1972 to 1978, the surrounding communities of Halsbach, Rodenbach, Ruppertshütten, Sackenbach, Steinbach, Wombach and Pflochsbach were amalgamated with the town. On 1 July 1972, the greater part of the District of Lohr (Landkreis Lohr) became part of the new District of Mittelmain (Landkreis Mittelmain), which in 1973 was given its current name, Main-Spessart. At first, Lohr am Main was chosen as the district seat (Kreisstadt), but in October 1972 it was decided that Karlstadt would be the new district seat, and the Landratsamt (district office) was moved from Lohr to Karlstadt.

Economy 
Lohr am Main is economically the most important centre in the Main-Spessart district. Out of some 12,000 workers on the social welfare contribution rolls working in town, only some 5,500 actually live in Lohr. The greater number of roughly 6,200 workers commute each day to Lohr. Comparing Lohr am Main with the district seat of Karlstadt, Lohr's importance stands out even more sharply. Although both towns have roughly the same population, Lohr am Main has about three times as many jobs. The greater number of jobs and the number of large businesses in town are also reflected in per-capita tax revenue: in 2005, this was about €1,000.

Economic structure
The most important industries are hydraulic machinery, electronics manufacturing as well as wood and glass processing. In addition, there are a large number of craftsmen's businesses.

Important employers in Lohr are:
 Bosch Rexroth AG (hydraulics, engine building and automation technology) with 6,620 employees, including the former Indramat
 Bezirkskrankenhaus Lohr (hospital for psychiatry, psychotherapy and psychosomatic medicine) with 607 employees
 Gerresheimer Lohr GmbH (specialty glass and plastics) with 350 employees
 ATY Automotive & Industrial Components GmbH with 250 employees
 Nikolaus Sorg GmbH & Co KG (glass processing) with 165 employees
 Walter Hunger KG (hydraulic components) with 160 employees
 OWI Oskar Winkler GmbH & Co.KG (wooden and plastic mouldings) with 120 employees

The local unemployment rate is less than 3%.

Logging
The town of Lohr am Main is, with its more than 6,300 ha of woodland (of which around 4,000 ha are municipally owned) Bavaria's second largest municipal forest owner. The town's woodlands are a mixed broadleaf forest managed under the precepts of the Arbeitsgemeinschaft Naturgemäße Waldwirtschaft (ANW, "Natural Forest Management Working Group"). Since 2000, the town's forest has been certified according to the Forest Stewardship Council's (FSC) criteria.

Arts and culture

Museums 

The  houses the Spessartmuseum. It deals mainly with economics and handicrafts, but also with the Spessart's regional history.

In the outlying centre of Sendelbach is a school museum with the foci '"Imperial Germany" (1871-1918) and "Third Reich" (1933-1945).

Germany's smallest museum is to be found on Haaggasse in a former transformer hut under monument protection, it shows a variety of insulators.

Buildings 

Outside of the town, there is the important pilgrimage site of  Monastery and the Baroque  and church in Steinbach.

The  ("Lohr old Main bridge"), an arch bridge, has spanned the river Main since 1875. One hundred years later, the 417 m-long  ("Lohr new Main bridge"), a prestressed-concrete structure was constructed.

Events 
The Lohr Good Friday Procession each year draws thousands of visitors. Thirteen life-sized figures mark the Way of the Cross. The figures are borne and overseen by members of the various craftsmen's guilds. The Procession is actually a remnant of a once much greater, Baroque figure procession. It likely arose in the years after the Thirty Years' War. The earliest confirmed mention in the church records kept by Saint Michael's parish comes from 1656.

Going back to a vow made during the Plague in 1666 is the Lohr custom of holding a procession each year on Saint Roch's Day (16 August) to the Valentinusberg (hill) above the town and holding festive church services there in honour of the Holy Trinity.

Spessartsommer combines an array of summertime events such as Lohrer Tanzfest (dance festival), Altstadtfest (old town festival), City-Festival and Klingendes Lohr (ringing Lohr).

Of particular importance is the Spessartfestwoche ("Spessart festival week"), which lasts ten days around 1 August. A Bavarian beer tent with seating for 4,500 and live music and a beergarden right on the Main with seating for a further 2,000 form the event’s centrepiece. There are also rides and a fireworks finale. In 2008, the 63rd Spessartfestwoche was held. The Festwochen-Express bus service’s 12 special lines to and from the festival saw a ridership of 23,416.

There are also cabaret and amateur theatre events in Lohr and the outlying centres.

Governance

Mayor
The mayor (Erster Bürgermeister) of Lohr is Mario Paul. He was elected in March 2014. He is the successor of Ernst-Heinrich Prüße (CSU).

Coat of arms 
The town's arms might be described thus: Barry of ten gules and Or a bend wavy azure.

The town's arms are essentially those borne by the Counts of Rieneck, who were the local lords from the 13th century until 1559. The wavy bend most likely refers to the Lohrbach, a local stream. The town’s oldest known seal, from 1408, already shows this design. Over time, the number of bars in the escutcheon has varied, as has the tincture of the bend (a version published in the 1920s, for instance, showed “Barry of nine gules and Or a bend wavy vert” – with nine bars and a green bend), for there was no proper blazon for the arms until 1957, when they were officially conferred on the town.

Town twinning
Lohr am Main is twinned with:
 Ouistreham, Calvados, France
 Burgeis, South Tyrol, Italy
 Milicz, Lower Silesia, Poland

Sponsorship 
 Přísečnice, Czech Republic
In 1956 the town undertook the sponsorship arrangement for Sudeten Germans driven out of their homeland in the town and district known in German as Preßnitz. The town itself no longer exists. In 1974, its former site became the bed of a new reservoir.

Infrastructure

Transport

Rail 
The Main-Spessart Railway (Main-Spessart-Bahn) from Würzburg and Gemünden leaves the Main valley on the way to Aschaffenburg–Frankfurt am Main and crosses through the Spessart.

The  from Lohr station through the town was a single-track, unelectrified, standard-gauge line to Wertheim. Passenger transport between Lohr-Town station and Wertheim was discontinued on 30 May 1976. Passenger service between Lohr-Bahnhof and Lohr-Town ended on 22 May 1977, although this part of the line is still in use for occasional goods transports. The former Lohr-Town station was converted to a pub.

A direct early InterCity service to Munich was replaced with a Regionalbahn to Würzburg when the Nuremberg–Munich high-speed railway came into service in 2006. The nearest InterCityExpress stops are Aschaffenburg and Würzburg.

On the eastern edge of town runs a short stretch of the Mühlbergtunnel on the Hanover-Würzburg high-speed rail line running north-south. Also within town limits runs a part of the Nantenbach Curve with the Schönraintunnel.

Road 
Lohr lies on Bundesstraße 26, Staatsstraße (State Road) 2435 and Staatsstraße 2315. The nearest Autobahnen are the A 3 (Munich - Würzburg – Frankfurt) through the Weibersbrunn, Hösbach and Marktheidenfeld interchanges, and the A 7 (Würzburg - Kassel) through the Hammelburg interchange.

Waterway 

Healthcare
Lohr has at its disposal a Kreiskrankenhaus (District Hospital) with the disciplines of surgery, internal medicine, anaesthesiology, neurology, gynaecology, urology, ophthalmology and otolaryngology, and also the Bezirkskrankenhaus (Regional Hospital) for psychiatry, psychotherapy, psychosomatic medicine and forensic medicine for the Regierungsbezirk of Lower Franconia (Unterfranken).

Education 
 Primary schools: Lohr am Main, Rodenbach, Sackenbach, Sendelbach, Wombach
 Special education schools: St. Kilian-Schule Sonderpädagogisches Förderzentrum Marktheidenfeld – Lohr; St. Nikolaus-Schule with emphasis on mental development
 Hauptschule: Gustav-Woehrnitz-Volksschule Lohr am Main
 Realschule: Georg-Ludwig-Rexroth-Realschule
 Gymnasium: Franz-Ludwig-von-Erthal-Gymnasium
 Vocational school: Staatliche Berufsschule Main-Spessart with professional school and training centre
 Professional school - Berufsfachschule für Krankenpflege (nursing)
 Forest school: Bayerische Forstschule
 Forest management school: Bayerische Technikerschule für Waldwirtschaft
 IGM education centre
 Music school: municipal singing and music school
 Folk high school: Volkshochschule der Stadt Lohr am Main

Notable people 

 Hans Blum (between 1520 and 1527-around or after 1552), architectural theorist
 Philipp Valentin Voit von Rieneck (1612-1672), Prince Bishop of the Hochstift Bamberg
  (1706–1770), Bishop of Speyer (born in Steinbach)
 Franz Ludwig von Erthal (1730–1795), Bishop of Bamberg and Würzburg
  (4 October 1735 – 23 May 1799 in Strasbourg), constitutional (not authorized by the Church) Bishop of Strasbourg during the French Revolution
  (1813–1899), German architect and building engineer.
 Joseph Koeth (1870–1936), politician and Reich minister in the Weimar Republic
 Ignatius Taschner (1871-1913), artist between Jugendstil and Neoclassicism
 Alfred Rexroth (1899-1978), Engineer, Entrepreneur, and Anthroposophist
  (1937-2016), pharmacist and pharmaceutical historian
  (1944–2013), writer and translator
 Hermann Joha (1960–    ), stuntman, owner and managing director of the Actionfilm production company Alarm für Cobra 11 
 Nadine Angerer (1978–    ), football world champion 2007, European Champion 2009 and 2013
 Nicolai Müller (1987-), football player

Other 
 Lohr is one of the places that claim to be Snow White’s birthplace.

Further reading 
 Christ, Günter: Lohr am Main. Der ehemalige Landkreis. Hrsg. von der Kommission für Bayerische Landesgeschichte bei der Bayerischen Akademie der Wissenschaften. Laßleben, Kallmünz 2007, 
 Loibl, Werner: Die kurmainzische Spiegelmanufaktur Lohr am Main (1698–1806) und die Nachfolgebetriebe im Spessart, 3 Volumes. Geschichts- und Kunstverein Aschaffenburg, Aschaffenburg 2012.
 Ruf, Alfons, Die Pfarrkirche St. Michael in Lohr und ihre Baugeschichte. Lohr a. Main, 1983.
 Ruf, Theodor,  Quellen und Erläuterungen zur Geschichte der Lohr am Main bis zum Jahre 1559, Lohr a. Main,  2011. 
 Ruf, Theodor: Die Grafen von Rieneck. Genealogie und Territorienbildung. Würzburg 1984 (town history)

References

External links 

 
 Town’s official webpage 
 
 Handball in Lohr 

11th-century establishments in the Holy Roman Empire
Main-Spessart
Populated places on the Main basin
Populated riverside places in Germany